Yayasan Kemanusiaan Ibu Pertiwi (YKIP), or "Humanitarian Foundation for Mother Earth", is an Indonesian non-profit organization dedicated to helping the needy in Bali through health and education programs. The charity was founded in the wake of the 2002 Bali bombings that left 255 people dead and 446 injured. It was cited Coconut's Bali as one of ten charities doing "amazing work in Bali"

History
YKIP was founded on 12 October, 2002 as a response to the 2002 Bali bombings. The initial organization was the Bali Recovery Group, which spent the first six months after the bombing providing support to the various NGOs who came in to help with the relief operations.

The year 2003 saw YKIP focusing exclusively on helping the victims of the 2002 incident. After the victims' basic necessities were fulfilled, YKIP started to focus on health and education issues, and conducted projects that concentrated more on aiding the less fortunate in Bali.

Office
Mitrais, an IT company with its head office in Bali, has supported YKIP ever since the latter was founded. Starting from organizing the medical assistance to Bali right after the bombing, Mitrais has provided office space, accountant support, IT, internet, and other forms of assistance. The senior staff of Mitrais are the members of the board of YKIP. In July 2007, YKIP had its own fully furnished and equipped office in the back of Mitrais' office in Kuta; the physical closeness of the two organisations makes their work easier.

Projects

2002 Bombing Aid
At the time of the bombing, Bali did not have the proper emergency and health facilities to handle the disastrous event. The Indonesian government allowed foreign police and military personnel (mainly from Australia) to enter Bali to assist in providing aid.

Over 1000 volunteers from 25 different countries provides assistance in many forms. At this point, the spirit of the founders and donors for YKIP continue to help the Indonesians who suffer directly (the wounded, the widows, and the orphans) or indirectly (economically, as a result of a fall of tourism industries).

KEMBALI/Kids Education Management in Bali (Scholarship Programs in Bali)
This is a program aimed at keeping children from dropping out of school. This program  assists over 500 primary and high school children and on into higher educations. This yearly scholarship costs from US $182 – $430 annually per child depending on what class they are in. For details, see http://www.ykip.org/our-programs/kembali/education-cost/.

School Renovations
250 chairs and desks for five elementary schools in North Bali were made and distributed in 2004.. The Sister school program with the Australian and Canadian schools has helped renovate the classrooms, school yards, and to provide a small library.

Children’s Education Trust Fund
This program helps provide a comprehensive education, school uniforms and supplies for children whose parents died in the Bali bombing. The KIDS (Kuta International Disaster Scholarship) program was established right after the bombing and is now a YKIP project. The collected funds are sufficient to school the children up through university.

2005 Bali Bombing Aid
Emergencies restoration and funeral finances were provided for some families. Courses and training have been taken by some of the families to help improve their financial position. A credit program has been made available for those who want to increase their business skills.

Medical Service Aid
MREC or Medical Research and Education Centre, housed at Udayana University in Denpasar, Bali was originally funded by the Annika Linden Foundation.   Numerous medical texts were purchased and a small computer lab put into place.  Currently, MREC is funded by the university itself.

Hearing Impaired Children Aid
In cooperation with LUMINA Hearing Center in Denpasar, YKIP and the Annika Linden Foundation have helped many children in improving their hearing, providing hearing aids and paying the yearly treatment fee. In 2007, Sushrusa Playgroup was opened as the first pre-school dedicated to hearing-impaired children in Bali.

Elder Support Aid
Together with Tropical Homes, YKIP helped Wana Seraya Retirement Home by providing healthy lunches, medicines, nurses and spiritual trainers for Hindus.

Rama Sesana Foundation, the Clinic for women’s reproduction health in Badung Market
This group conducts free health seminars and provides affordable medical consultation on women’s reproductive health, and have helped more than 10,000 people per year.

A health census of the women who work in the market showed that they average 35 years old, and most of them are married. 75% of the total respondents have not received a primary school education, one out of three women earns less than 2 dollars a day, and there is a high potential for STDs.

The goal of this project is to enrich the people’s knowledge on reproductive health issues and encourage them to have a safe sex life and make use of the health facilities.

There is a VCT unit for HIV/AIDS testing at the Centre.

YAKEBA narcotics and alcohol counselling program, and HIV/AIDS in schools and society.
This interactive program sends doctors and ex-users to schools and village centres to help teenagers become aware of the danger of alcohol and narcotics, and how these things can lead to HIV/AIDS. The doctors provide the teenagers with accurate information on HIV/AIDS and drugs abuse.

The counselling used cartoons and interesting scheme and power point presentations, where the doctors asked the participants about their lives interactively. Gifts, mainly stationery items, were given to the participants who answered correctly; the doctors gave those who could not answer, the correct information. The program reached almost 8000 people per year.

As of 2010, YKIP was no longer funding YAKEBA.

Helping the Physically Impaired
YAKKUM Bali is a non-profit organization which helps people with disabilities in poor areas in Bali. Through the physical rehab programs (operations, physiotherapy and occupational therapy, trainings), YAKKUM Bali improves people’s lives in terms of their economical and social freedom, their self-confidence and their place in society.

East Bali Poverty Project
2002-2006 projects
 Women’s Health Program in North Bali.
 Traumatic counselling through the leather puppet show (wayang kulit).
 Distribute the medicines donations.
 Medical equipment for Emergency Units.
 Direct aid for the Bali bombing victims.

Associated organisations

In 2003, Mark Weingard established the Annika Linden Foundation, named for his fiancée, Annika Linden, who died during the bombing in Kuta, Bali. The major contributor to the Foundation is RESET Pte Limited, a financial company which focuses its business on the world’s stock market. RESET Pte Limited supports the foundation by conducting a fund raising event, the proceeds from which are donated in their entirety to ALF.

ALF has donated to YKIP since 2003. The foundation believes that positive actions will erase negative impacts after the Bali bombing. The fund's donations assist YKIP to conduct their existing programs.

In 2011, the Annika Linden Foundation changed its name to the Inspirasia Foundation.

References
 “SIAPA” in Bali Advertiser, 2007.
 Garuda Magazine, March 2006.

External links
 Inspirasia Foundation
 Mitrais

Foundations based in Indonesia